Nurul Huda (born 24 January 1965) is an Indian politician. He is Member of the Assam Legislative Assembly from the Rupohihat Assembly constituency since 2016. He is associated with the Indian National Congress.

References 

1965 births
Assam MLAs 2016–2021
Living people